This article contains a list of current SNCF railway stations in the Pays de la Loire region of France.

Loire-Atlantique (44)

 Abbaretz
 Ancenis
 Babinière
 Basse-Indre-Saint-Herblain
 Batz-sur-Mer
 La Baule-Escoublac
 La Baule-les-Pins
 La Bernerie-en-Retz
 Beslé
 Bouaye
 Bourgneuf-en-Retz
 Boussay-La Bruffière
 Le Cellier
 Chantenay
 La Chapelle-Aulnay
 La Chapelle-Centre
 Châteaubriant
 Clisson
 Cordemais
 Couëron
 Le Croisic
 La Croix-de-Méan
 Donges
 Drefféac
 Erdre-Active
 Gorges
 La Haie-Fouassière
 Haluchère-Batignolles
 Issé
 Machecoul
 Massérac
 Mauves-sur-Loire
 Montoir-de-Bretagne
 Les Moutiers-en-Retz
 Nantes
 Nort-sur-Erdre
 Oudon
 Le Pallet
 Penhoët
 Pontchâteau
 Pornic
 Pornichet
 Port-Saint-Père-Saint-Mars
 Le Pouliguen
 Rezé-Pont-Rousseau
 Sainte-Pazanne
 Saint-Étienne-de-Montluc
 Saint-Gildas-des-Bois
 Saint-Hilaire-de-Chaléons
 Saint-Nazaire
 Saint-Sébastien-Frêne-Rond
 Saint-Sébastien-Pas-Enchantés
 Savenay
 Sévérac
 Sucé-sur-Erdre
 Thouaré
 Varades-Saint-Florent-le-Vieil
 Vertou

Maine-et-Loire (49)

 Angers-Maître-École
 Angers-Saint-Laud
 La Bohalle
 Chalonnes
 Champtocé-sur-Loire
 Chemillé
 Cholet
 Écouflant
 Étriché-Châteauneuf
 Ingrandes-sur-Loire
 La Ménitré
 Montreuil-Bellay
 Morannes
 La Possonnière
 Les Rosiers-sur-Loire
 Saint-Mathurin
 Saumur
 Savennières-Béhuard
 Tiercé
 Torfou
 Trélazé
 Le Vieux-Briollay

Mayenne (53)

 Évron
 Le Genest
 Laval
 Louverné
 Montsûrs
 Neau
 Port-Brillet
 Saint-Pierre-la-Cour
 Voutré

Sarthe (72)

 Arnage
 Aubigné-Racan
 Champagné
 Château-du-Loir
 Conlie
 Connerré-Beillé
 Crissé
 Domfont
 Écommoy
 La Ferté-Bernard
 La Guierche
 La Hutte-Coulombiers
 Laigneé-Saint-Gervais
 Le Mans
 Mayet
 Montbizot
 Montfort-le-Gesnois
 Neuvile-sur-Sarthe
 Noyen
 Rouessé-Vassé
 Sablé-sur-Sarthe
 Saint-Mars-la-Brière
 Sceaux-Boëssé
 Sillé-le-Guillaume
 La Suze
 Teillé
 Vaas
 Vivoin-Beaumont
 Voivres

Vendée (85)

 Belleville-sur-Vie
 Bournezeau
 La Chaize-le-Vicomte
 Challans
 Chantonnay
 Cugand
 Fougeré
 L'Herbergement-Les Brouzils
 Luçon
 Montaigu
 La Mothe-Achard
 Olonne-sur-Mer
 Pouzauges
 La Roche-sur-Yon
 Les Sables-d'Olonne
 Saint-Gilles-Croix-de-Vie
 Saint-Hilaire-de-Riez

See also
 SNCF 
 List of SNCF stations for SNCF stations in other regions

Pays